Karlstad Airport  is situated 16 km (10 mi) from Karlstad city centre in Sweden.

Airlines and destinations
The following airlines operate regular scheduled and charter flights at Karlstad Airport:

Statistics

From Transportstyrelsen and Karlstad flygplats:

History 
The airport was opened for traffic in 1997. The airport was built since the older Karlstad-Jakobsberg airport was causing noise to many residents due to its location 3 km from Karlstad city centre, and also because a longer runway was desired. The old airport had too short runway for charter flights to southern Europe, but such flights became common from the opening of the new airport. The route to Stockholm had still a large majority of the passengers the first years, but this route declined due to other available transport modes such as car and train on this fairly short route, and was finally closed in 2020 after reduced demand as a result of the COVID-19 pandemic.

References

External links

Official website

Airports in Sweden
Karlstad
Buildings and structures in Värmland County
International airports in Sweden